Paul Kamuza Bakyenga is a Roman Catholic priest, who was the Archbishop of the Archdiocese of Mbarara, since 2 January 1999. Pope Francis accepted his resignation on 25 April 2020 and appointed Auxiliary Bishop Lambert Bainomugisha as the Archbishop of Mbarara, Uganda.

Early life and priesthood
Bakyenga was born on 30 June 1944, in Bumbaire Village, Igara sub-county, in present-day Bushenyi District in the Western Region of Uganda.
He attended pre-primary school in the church building at Bweeza, Bushenyi District. He went on to attend Ibaare Primary School, before he joined Ibanda Preparatory Seminary from 1958 until 1960. In 1961, he joined Kitabi Seminary, where he graduated with a High School Diploma. He was admitted to Bukalasa Minor Seminary, in present-day Kalungu District  for his A-Level studies but he did not complete. He was expelled, along with others, for “indiscipline”.

After teaching briefly at Rushoroza Seminary, in Kabale District, he was then admitted at Katigondo Major Seminary, in Kalungu District to study philosophy but abandoned the course after two years. At this point, Bishop John Baptist Kakubi of Mbarara, sent him to study at St Andrews College in Scotland, where he obtained a degree in Theology.

He was ordained a priest on 11 July 1971 at Mbarara at the age of 27. He served as priest in the Roman Catholic Archdiocese of Mbarara, until 6 March 1989.

As bishop
He was appointed Coadjutor Bishop of Mbarara, Uganda on 6 March 1989. He was consecrated as bishop on 24 June 1989 at Mbarara by Bishop John Baptist Kakubi†, Bishop of Mbarara, assisted by Bishop Adrian Kivumbi Ddungu†, Bishop of Masaka and Bishop Serapio Bwemi Magambo†, Bishop of Fort Portal.

On 23 November 1991, he succeeded as bishop of Mbarara, replacing the late Bishop John Baptist Kakubi, who resigned. He was appointed Archbishop of Mbarara on 2 January 1999.

See also
 Uganda Martyrs
 Holy Innocents Children's Hospital
 Roman Catholicism in Uganda

Succession table

References

External links

Mbarara Archbishop Set To Retire As of 12 July 2018.
Ailing Archbishop Bakyenga Asks Pope Francis to Retire Him ... As of 9 July 2018.

1944 births
Living people
20th-century Roman Catholic bishops in Uganda
21st-century Roman Catholic archbishops in Uganda
People from Bushenyi District
Roman Catholic bishops of Mbarara
Roman Catholic archbishops of Mbarara